Andreas John Karlsson (born August 19, 1975) is a retired Swedish professional ice hockey player.

Playing career
Karlsson is a good skater and playmaker with good technical skills. During the season 2005–06 he has also shown that he is an efficient goal scorer. He is sometimes called "Pastorn", which is Swedish for "The Pastor".

He played his first international game with Team Sweden on December 16, 1995, against Czech Republic in Helsinki, Finland. Karlsson was drafted by Calgary Flames with their 6th pick, 148th overall, in the 1993 NHL Entry Draft. Since then he has played for Atlanta Thrashers, Orlando Solar Bears, and Chicago Wolves in the United States.

In 2006, Karlsson signed a one-year contract with Tampa Bay Lightning in the NHL, as their third line center with both scoring and defensive capabilities. After two seasons, totalling 13 points in 111 regular season games, he returned to his native Sweden and signed a three-year deal with Frölunda HC in Elitserien.

Coaching career
 Frölunda Indians Under 20 juniors
 Assistant Coach 2011-12
 Head Coach 2012–present
Frolunda Indians

In 2015, he joined the coaching staff at York University for the 2015-16 season.

Awards
 TV-pucken champion with Dalarna in 1990.
 Baltica Brewery Cup's Best forward in 1998.
 Calder Cup winner with the Chicago Wolves in 2002.
 Awarded the Håkan Loob Trophy (Most goals scored in Elitserien) in 2006.
 Awarded Guldhjälmen (Elitserien's Most Valuable Player) in 2006.
 Gold medal at the Ice Hockey World Championship in 2006.
 Named to the Swedish All-Star Team in 2006.

Records
 Elitserien regular season 2005–06 record for points (55)
 Elitserien regular season 2005–06 record for goals (26) -- (Shared with Tomi Kallio)

Career statistics

Regular season and playoffs

International

Statistics as of April 13, 2006

References

External links

1975 births
Living people
Atlanta Thrashers players
Calgary Flames draft picks
Chicago Wolves players
EHC Basel players
Frölunda HC players
HV71 players
Leksands IF players
Orlando Solar Bears (IHL) players
People from Ludvika Municipality
Swedish expatriate sportspeople in Switzerland
Swedish expatriate ice hockey players in the United States
Swedish ice hockey centres
Tampa Bay Lightning players
Sportspeople from Dalarna County